Mercy Amua-Quarshie is a Ghanaian obstetrician-gynecologist in Dallas, Texas. She earned the Berlex Labs award for best OBGYN teaching resident while completing her OBGYN residency at Boston Medical Center/Boston University.

Early life 
She was born in Ghana, West Africa, but grew up in New York, where she obtained her medical degree from New York University School of Medicine in 1995 and then went on to Boston Medical Center/Boston University for residency study in OBGYN.

Education and career 
Amua-Quarshie completed Master of Public Health program at Columbia University in the city of New York in 1991. She graduated from New York University School of Medicine in 1995 and went on to Boston Medical Center/Boston University for OBGYN residency study in 1999. She was named best OBGYN teaching resident and got a Berlex Labs award during her time there. She returned to the greater New York region after completing her residency training in 1999, where she worked in both teaching hospitals and private practice settings.

She and her family later went to the south, to the Dallas Fort Worth region, where she worked as an OBGYN Hospitalist Physician for several years in the Methodist Health system. She is a Certified Menopause Practitioner with the North American Menopause Society (NAMS).

References 

Gynaecologists
Women gynaecologists
Year of birth missing (living people)
Living people